Les Briley (born 2 October 1956 in Lambeth) is an English former footballer who played as a midfielder in the Football League for Hereford United, Wimbledon, Aldershot, Millwall and Brighton & Hove Albion. He began his career as an apprentice with Chelsea, without playing for the first team. He is currently Millwall's Assistant Youth Academy Manager.

References

External links
 

1956 births
Living people
Footballers from Lambeth
English footballers
Association football midfielders
Chelsea F.C. players
Hereford United F.C. players
Wimbledon F.C. players
Aldershot F.C. players
Millwall F.C. players
Brighton & Hove Albion F.C. players
Slough Town F.C. players
English Football League players